Aliabad-e Kapur Chal (also Romanized as ‘Alīābād-e Kapūr Chāl; also known as ‘Alīābād) is a village in Chahar Farizeh Rural District, in the Central District of Bandar-e Anzali County, Gilan Province, Iran. At the 2006 census, its population was 896, in 263 families.

References 

Populated places in Bandar-e Anzali County